Álvaro del Moral Galán (born 9 May 1984 in Madrid) is a Spanish footballer who plays for CD Buñol as a forward.

External links

1984 births
Living people
Footballers from Madrid
Spanish footballers
Association football forwards
Segunda División players
Segunda División B players
Tercera División players
Atlético Madrid B players
RSD Alcalá players
CD Linares players
Benidorm CF footballers
Levante UD footballers
UD Logroñés players
UD Melilla footballers
First Vienna FC players
Spanish expatriate footballers
Expatriate footballers in Sweden
Expatriate footballers in Austria